Shelburne Falls is a historic village in the towns of Shelburne and Buckland in Franklin County, Massachusetts, United States. The village is a census-designated place (CDP) with a population of 1,731 at the 2010 census. It is part of the Springfield, Massachusetts, Metropolitan Statistical Area.

Notable features include the Bridge of Flowers, a former trolley bridge over the Deerfield River that is now maintained by the Shelburne Falls Women's Club as a floral display from April through October; the Shelburne Falls Trolley Museum; and the glacial potholes of the Deerfield River. The downtown includes an independently owned pharmacy with a soda fountain, one coffee shop, a trolley museum, several restaurants, two pizza parlors, three bookstores, a newsstand, a country doctor, a grocery store, a natural foods store, many artists' galleries, and the second oldest bowling alley in the country, the Shelburne Falls Bowling Alley candlepin. A community newspaper, the West County Independent, serves Shelburne Falls and the surrounding towns. On the Shelburne side of town is the Buckland-Shelburne Elementary School, with over 200 students. On the Buckland side of town is Mohawk Trail Regional Middle School/High School with approximately 500 students.

History
Silas Lamson was a 19th-century American inventor and manufacturer of scythe handles, agricultural implements, knives and cutlery. In 1834, Lamson patented a method for manufacturing curved snath handles for scythes used to harvest hay and wheat. The downward curve of the handle was an ergonomic improvement over straight-handled scythes. Three years later he partnered with two of his sons and with Abel Goodnow to found Lamson & Goodnow, a knife manufacturing company, in Shelburne Falls. By the time of the Civil War, the company employed more than 500 workers, making it one of the largest cutlery companies in the United States. The company exists in the 21st century as Lamson, with an outlet store in Shelburne Falls.

Historic district
A  area, including the commercial center of the village, was listed on the National Register of Historic Places as Shelburne Falls Historic District in 1988, and the Odd Fellows' Hall was also NRHP-listed in 1979.

Geography
The Deerfield River bisects Shelburne Falls, and Massaemett Mountain rises east of the village.

According to the United States Census Bureau, the CDP has a total area of 6.8 km (2.6 mi). 6.6 km (2.5 mi) of it is land and 0.3 km (0.1 mi) of it (3.79%) is water.  Shelburne Falls is served by Massachusetts Route 2, also known as the Mohawk Trail, as well as Routes 2A and 112, the former being the main route through the village.

Demographics

As of the census of 2000, there were 1,951 people, 815 households, and 466 families residing in the CDP. The population density was 296.6/km (768.3/mi). There were 878 housing units at an average density of 133.5/km (345.8/mi). The racial makeup of the CDP was 96.92% White, 0.26% African American, 0.67% Native American, 0.67% Asian, 0.05% Pacific Islander, 0.46% from other races, and 0.97% from two or more races. Hispanic or Latino of any race were 0.82% of the population.

There were 815 households, out of which 27.2% had children under the age of 18 living with them, 41.3% were married couples living together, 12.4% had a female householder with no husband present, and 42.7% were non-families. 34.0% of all households were made up of individuals, and 15.2% had someone living alone who was 65 years of age or older. The average household size was 2.28 and the average family size was 2.94.

In the CDP, the population was spread out, with 21.8% under the age of 18, 8.8% from 18 to 24, 25.3% from 25 to 44, 25.1% from 45 to 64, and 19.0% who were 65 years of age or older. The median age was 41 years. For every 100 females, there were 86.5 males. For every 100 females age 18 and over, there were 80.3 males.

The median income for a household in the CDP was $36,333, and the median income for a family was $41,250. Males had a median income of $32,403 versus $26,534 for females. The per capita income for the CDP was $18,367. About 7.4% of families and 10.1% of the population were below the poverty line, including 9.5% of those under age 18 and 9.6% of those age 65 or over.

Notable people
 Bill Cosby, comedian 
 Camille Cosby
 Halbert S. Greenleaf, former US congressman
 Silas Lamson, Lamson & Goodnow knife factory co-founder
 Epaphroditus Ransom, 7th Governor of Michigan
 Linus Yale, Jr.

Sister cities
In May 2007, selectmen from the towns of Buckland and Shelburne inked a memorandum of agreement with officials from Mutianyu, a village in China, making the two the first known "sister villages".

Gallery

See also
Shelburne Falls Trolley Museum
National Register of Historic Places listings in Franklin County, Massachusetts

References

External links
 Shelburne Falls Area Business Association

Census-designated places in Franklin County, Massachusetts
Springfield metropolitan area, Massachusetts
Historic districts on the National Register of Historic Places in Massachusetts
Census-designated places in Massachusetts
National Register of Historic Places in Franklin County, Massachusetts
Shelburne, Massachusetts
Buckland, Massachusetts